Robert Payne may refer to:

Robert Payne (agriculturalist) (died 1593), planter in Ireland
Robert Payne (Gloucester MP) (c. 1630 – 1713), MP for Gloucester
Sir Robert Payne (Huntingdonshire MP) (1573–1631), MP for Huntingdonshire
Robert Payne (natural philosopher) (1596–1651), clergyman and natural philosopher
Robert Payne Smith (1818–1895), Anglican Dean of Canterbury
Robert Payne (author) (1911–1983), English novelist, historian and biographer
Robert B. Payne, American ornithologist and professor
Robert E. Payne (born 1941), U.S. federal judge

See also 

Rob Payne, Canadian novelist
Robert Paine (disambiguation)